Lothringen, or Lorraine, is a region of northeastern France.

Lothringen may also refer to:
 Battery Lothringen, a World War II coastal artillery battery in Jersey
 Bezirk Lothringen, a German Department from 1871 to 1918 
 CdZ-Gebiet Lothringen, an administrative division under German occupation 1940-1945
 SMS Lothringen, a pre-dreadnought battleship of the Imperial German Navy 
 Lothringen (oil tanker), a tanker that supplied oil to the German battleship Bismarck, amongst others

See also
 House of Habsburg-Lothringen